Aphrophora saratogensis, the Saratoga spittlebug, is a species of spittlebug in the family Aphrophoridae. It is found in North America.

References

External links

Articles created by Qbugbot
Insects described in 1851
Aphrophoridae